Simon Peter Jabir Kay  is a British consultant plastic surgeon, born and educated in Guernsey, Channel Islands, based in Leeds. Kay carried out the UK's first hand transplant operation. Kay trained in plastic surgery in the UK in Wexham, Birmingham, and Manchester, with secondments for specialist training in Adelaide, Australia and Louisville, Kentucky, United States.

Kay's decision to become a surgeon—particularly a plastic surgeon—came about due to his own childhood where he burnt his finger on a small electric fire when he was five. He had to endure many operations, which he states were unnecessary and led him to want to become a surgeon, but also someone who would always ask "what is in the best interests of the patient?"

He was appointed an Officer of the Order of the British Empire (OBE) in the 2019 New Year Honours for services to Complex Reconstructive Hand Surgery including Hand Transplantation. In November 2001, "The Times" named Kay as one of the top doctors employed in Britain at that time.

References

External links
BAAPS page
BAPRAS page

British surgeons
Year of birth missing (living people)
Living people
People educated at Elizabeth College, Guernsey
Officers of the Order of the British Empire